National Route 457 is a national highway of Japan connecting Ichinoseki, Iwate and Shiroishi, Miyagi in Japan, with a total length of 173.9 km (108.06 mi).

References

National highways in Japan
Roads in Iwate Prefecture
Roads in Miyagi Prefecture